James H. Hallinan (May 27, 1849 – October 28, 1879) was an Irish born professional baseball player. In the first professional league season, he played shortstop in five games for the 1871 Fort Wayne Kekiongas. He returned to professional play four years later and worked as a regular player for five teams in four major league seasons, including two as the regular shortstop of the New York Mutuals.

Early years
During that stretch, he played a few professional games for the  Fort Wayne Kekiongas of the National Association.

Major league career
He played every inning of their 13 games at shortstop and, when the Westerns folded, moved on to the New York Mutuals for the remainder of that season and all of 1876, when the Mutuals were a founding member of the National League. His two home runs ranked third in the league. With three in 1875 he had ranked fourth in the NA. The Clipper observed that he, "being remarkably fleet of foot, was often credited with home runs."

When the Reds disbanded during business troubles, it looked as if the team was going to fold; he and Charley Jones agreed to sign and play with the Chicago White Stockings. The Reds eventually corrected their situation, and asked for their two players back. The two teams agreed that Jones would return to the Reds while Hallinan would remain with the White Stockings.

Although he was a better than average hitter, he lacked skill in the field. For his career, he hit .287 in 170 games, but in his 111 games at shortstop, he totaled 161 errors for a .744 fielding percentage. He didn't fare much better in his games in the outfield or at second base, as his career total was .756. Early in his career, he spent most of his playing time at shortstop, but he was later moved to the outfield.

Death
It is alleged that the reason Jimmy became too ill to play was most likely due from overuse of alcohol. In October of the following year, he succumbed to inflammation of the bowels and died at 30 years of age in Chicago. He was interred at the Calvary Catholic Cemetery in Evanston, Illinois.

See also

List of players from Ireland in Major League Baseball

References

External links

Major League Baseball shortstops
Fort Wayne Kekiongas players
Keokuk Westerns players
New York Mutuals players
Cincinnati Reds (1876–1879) players
Chicago White Stockings players
Indianapolis Blues players
Major League Baseball players from Ireland
Irish baseball players
Irish emigrants to the United States (before 1923)
19th-century baseball players
1849 births
1879 deaths
19th-century Irish people
Deaths from gastritis
Burials at Calvary Cemetery (Evanston, Illinois)